The Wimbish House is a historic building in Atlanta, Georgia, United States, commissioned in 1898 and finished in 1906. It has been owned and operated by The Atlanta Woman's Club since they purchased it in 1920. The idea for the house came from Mrs. Susie Lenora Wimbish (née Dickinson), after being inspired by the châteauesque style homes she saw in the south of France. It was designed by architect Walter T. Downing. It was listed on the National Register of Historic Places in 1979 as "Atlanta Women's Club Complex". The complex is listed as being in three parts: the Clubhouse, Banquet Hall and the Auditorium.

It has also been known as Peachtree Playhouse and as Community Playhouse.

See also 

 National Register of Historic Places listings in Fulton County, Georgia

References

External links
 
Building history on the Atlanta Woman's Club website atlwc.org 
 City Council Atlanta Georgia 'Landmark Building' document

Clubhouses on the National Register of Historic Places in Georgia (U.S. state)
Buildings and structures completed in 1922
Buildings and structures in Atlanta
National Register of Historic Places in Atlanta
History of women in Georgia (U.S. state)